Pat Dunn (born February 10, 1950) is a Canadian politician. He has represented the electoral district of Pictou Centre in the Nova Scotia House of Assembly from 2006 to 2009, and from 2013 to present, as a member of the Progressive Conservatives. He served as Minister of Health Promotion and Protection in the Executive Council of Nova Scotia.

He was defeated by Ross Landry of the New Democrats in the 2009 election, but was reelected in the 2013 election.

On August 31, 2021, Dunn was named Minister of Communities, Cultures, Tourism, and Heritage, as well as Minister of the Voluntary Sector and African Nova Scotian Affairs. Dunn represents one of the largest communities of African Nova Scotians outside Halifax.

Career
Dunn was born in Trenton in 1950. He is a graduate of Saint Francis Xavier University with degrees in Arts and Education. Before working as a teacher and an educator, he worked at a Michelin factory in Granton, Nova Scotia and for a number of local businesses. He is currently married to his wife Patsy and they have six children.

Electoral record

 

|-

|Progressive Conservative
|Pat Dunn
|align="right"| 4147
|align="right"| 52.26
|align="right"|
|-

|New Democratic Party
|Ross Landry
|align="right"| 2373
|align="right"| 29.91
|align="right"|
|-

|Liberal
|Bill Muirhead
|align="right"| 1415
|align="right"| 17.83
|align="right"|
|}

|-

|New Democratic Party
|Ross Landry
|align="right"|3650
|align="right"|46.30
|align="right"|
|-

|Progressive Conservative
|Pat Dunn
|align="right"|3519
|align="right"|44.64
|align="right"|
|-

|Liberal
|Neil MacIsaac
|align="right"|567
|align="right"|7.19
|align="right"|
|-

|}

|-

|Progressive Conservative
|Pat Dunn
|align="right"|3901
|align="right"|52.60
|align="right"|
|-

|New Democratic Party
|Danny MacGillivray
|align="right"|2344
|align="right"|31.61
|align="right"|
|-

|Liberal
|Troy MacCulloch
|align="right"|1057
|align="right"|14.25
|align="right"|
|-

|-

|Independent
|Dennis Tate
|align="right"|20
|align="right"|0.27
|align="right"|
|}

References

External links
 Members of the Nova Scotia Legislative Assembly

1950 births
Canadian educators
Living people
Members of the Executive Council of Nova Scotia
People from New Glasgow, Nova Scotia
Progressive Conservative Association of Nova Scotia MLAs
21st-century Canadian politicians